Tony Backhouse (born 1947) is a singer, musician and composer from New Zealand and is a key player in the Australasian  a cappella movement. He played in New Zealand bands such as The Crocodiles, and formed Australian a cappella groups, the Elevators, the Cafe of the Gate of Salvation, the Honeybees and the Heavenly Lights. In NZ, he formed the Napier Gospel Choir. Currently he lives in Sydney and works as a singer, composer, author and workshop leader, in the areas of vocal arranging and gospel music. He composes and arranges mainly for a cappella choirs, always with an ear to vernacular traditions – contemporary funk, African choirs, gospel – and to anything polyphonic. Works that typify his style are Jubilation and (I've Been Given) Two Wing as sung by the Café of the Gate of Salvation.

Education and bands 1965—1985
Backhouse completed a B.A. (English), and B.Mus. (Composition) at Victoria University of Wellington, New Zealand, in 1970, under the tutorship of composers David Farquhar and Jenny McLeod. He later completed a graduate course in ethnomusicology (focusing on blues and gospel) at University of Memphis, USA, with Professor David Evans.

In the early seventies, Backhouse composed and performed music for NZ radio, theatre and film, but most of his energies were spent in NZ funk/soul/pop bands, including Mammal, Spats, Rough Justice and the Crocodiles (which won three Recording Industry Awards in 1980).

Relocating to Australia in 1981, and following the demise of the Crocodiles, Backhouse formed his own band, Vulgar Beatmen (with ex-Crocodile Jonathan Zwartz and ex-Rough Justice Peter Boyd and Mike Gubb) and sang and/or played guitar with Renée Geyer, Joe Walsh, Jenny Morris, Jackie Orszaszcky, the Dan Johnson Band and many others. He has arranged and recorded backing vocals for Dave Dobbyn, Tim Finn, Vince Jones, Justine Clarke, Kate Ceberano, Harry Manx and the Umbrellas.

Backhouse's songs have been recorded by Jenny Morris, Renée Geyer and others, and he has contributed to film soundtracks including Sweetie (Jane Campion), Rodney & Juliet (Fane Flaws) and Braindead (Peter Jackson).

A cappella & gospel
In the mid-eighties Backhouse became fascinated by the Black gospel tradition, and, as a result, increasingly involved in community music, choral directing and running vocal workshops. He founded the a cappella quartet the Elevators, a cappella gospel choirs the Café of the Gate of Salvation and the Honeybees and a cappella quartet the Heavenly Light Quartet.

Backhouse has received awards from the Contemporary A Cappella Society of America and composer commissions from The Song Company and the Australia Council. In 1990 he received an Australia Council International Study Grant to research Black gospel traditions at Memphis State University. In 2006, his song Lost in the Heavenly Light was nominated for the Australian Classical Music Awards for Vocal Work of the Year.

Since 1987, Backhouse has been running vocal workshops throughout Australia and New Zealand, Canada, the Pacific Islands, France, Italy and the UK, and has been a solo performer at festivals throughout Australia. He has published two African American gospel songbooks 'A cappella – Rehearsing For Heaven' (1995; accompanying double CD, 2003) and 'Move on Up' (2005), a book on directing vocal groups, 'Freeing the song' (2010), and a songbook of his original choral compositions 'In The Spirit'(2020).

2008 to present
Tony moved back to New Zealand in 2008, and continued to travel extensively, running workshops world-wide. He formed the Napier Gospel Choir in 2013, and sporadically contributed guitar and bass to gigs and recordings with Blessed Relief (Sydney), No Engine (Napier, NZ) and the Bend (NZ).
    He returned to live in Australia in 2018. His current activities include running workshops in a cappella traditions, composing and arranging for vocal ensembles and choirs, singing with the Heavenly Light Quartet and recording original music with long-time colleagues Peter Dasent and Fane Flaws under the name the Bend. Tony & Peter Dasent (as Blessed Relief) released an album of original songs in 2017, 'Design For Living'. His album of experimental music (largely instrumental, electronic and percussive) The Disturbing Hedge was released in 2020. The Bend's album,'We Disappear', poems by Sam Hunt set to music by Backhouse, Flaws and Dasent,was released in 2021.

Recordings
Beware The Man – Sam Hunt & Mammal (1974)

Tears – The Crocodiles (1980)

Looking at Ourselves – The Crocodiles (1981)

The Café of the Gate of Salvation (1991)

A Window in Heaven – The Café of the Gate of Salvation (1994)

The Heavenly Light Quartet - The Heavenly Light Quartet (1997)

Rehearsing For Heaven (gospel anthology & tutorial) (2003)

Deluxe -The Café of the Gate of Salvation (2004)

Design For Living - Blessed Relief (2017)

The Disturbing Hedge - Tony Backhouse (aka Van Da Miért) (2020)

Dig A Little Deeper - The Heavenly Light Quartet (2020)

We Disappear - the Bend (2021)

References
 Dix, John, Stranded in Paradise, Penguin, 2005. 
 Eggleton, David, Ready To Fly, Craig Potton, 2003. 
 Johnson, E. Patrick, Appropriating Blackness, Duke University Press, 2003. , 
 Lohrey, Amanda, Secrets pp 242–249 Macmillan 1997.
 Dowrick, Stephanie, Forgiveness and Other acts of love, pp 45–47, Viking 1997.
 Bithell, Caroline, A Different Voice, A Different Song, OUP, 2014.

External links
 Tony Backhouse Home Page
 Tony Backhouse blog
 Café of the Gate of Salvation website

1947 births
Living people
New Zealand expatriates in the United States
New Zealand musicians
University of Memphis alumni
Victoria University of Wellington alumni